St Joseph's Convent School is  an English medium girls school located at Idgah Hills Bhopal, India. Affiliated to the CBSE, the school was founded in 1956 by the Indian Province of the Sisters of St Joseph of Chambery, an order founded at Chambéry, France in 1812, it is administered by the Sisters of St Joseph's Convent, Idgah Hills,
Ranked as the best school in Bhopal for the 2nd consecutive time. Bhopal.

Overview
The school is an English Medium Senior Secondary School for girls, affiliated to Central Board of Secondary Education. The school conducts classes from Kindergarten to Senior Secondary level. The school is dedicated to St Joseph, and aims at forming a noble character through the practice of virtues.

The school has separate buildings for the kindergarten, primary and the higher secondary section. The campus is huge with lush, green trees and gardens. The school has an auditorium and an assembly hall. Sports facilities include a variety of games like Basketball, Volleyball, Kho-Kho, Badminton etc. And has two basketball courts, one Volleyball court, a Kho-Kho field and a big athletics track.

In addition to the Computer labs, the school also has labs for Physics, Chemistry, Biology, English and Mathematics.

The schools regularly organizes Annual Functions, Sports Meets and various other fests. The students of the school are known as the "Josephites".

Chronology of School History
1956 - Founded by Rev Mother Ignatius Steiret
1957 - Permanent Recognition from M.P. Board for Classes 1st to VIIIth.
1960 - Further recognition from M.P. board up to class XIIth and 1st batch of students appeared for 10th board exams(all in merit positions)
1961 - Introduction of NCC and House system
1962 - 1st Annual sports meet
1965 - National accolades to N.C.C. cadet- Miss Jaya Bhaduri as the Best Cadet at All India Level 
1973 - Closure of admission for boys in school
1981 - Inauguration of Women Empowerment cell-PREM SEVA KENDRA
1987 - Composite switch over from M.P. Board to C.B.S.E. affiliation
2003 - 1st Missionary school of M.P. to obtain ISO 9000:2001 Certification
2006 - Flagged off Golden Jubilee Celebration on 9 July
2016 - Celebrated Diamond Jubilee
2016 - Students win medals in Colombo

School Anthem
                School life is long 
                The end seems so far
                But ambitions are hitched to the star
                As we train and we learn 
                We shall ever remember
                Virtue alone ennobles

Chorus:- 
         Work and prayer are chosen way of life
         Hope and peace to gladden every day
         Confidence and courage in every form of strife
         Faith and love to conquer all the way

              School life is a rock 
              On which we shall build
              With a spirit of God to filled 
              As we grow in our minds 
              May this truth be instilled 
              Virtue alone ennobles

Notable alumni
 Jaya Bachchan

References

Sources

External links
 St Joseph's Convent School, Bhopal at wikimapia
Official website of the school

Congregation of the Sisters of Saint Joseph
Catholic secondary schools in India
Private schools in Madhya Pradesh
Girls' schools in Madhya Pradesh
Christian schools in Madhya Pradesh
Schools in Bhopal
Educational institutions established in 1956
1956 establishments in Madhya Pradesh